Weston Blaine Richburg (born July 9, 1991) is a former American football center. He was drafted by the New York Giants in the second round of the 2014 NFL Draft, and also played for the San Francisco 49ers. He played college football at Colorado State.

High school career 
A native of Bushland, Texas, Richburg attended Bushland High School, where he was a two-sport star in football and track. In football, he was a two-way lineman and team captain. As a senior, he recorded two sacks as a defensive lineman, but earned first-team all-district honors on the offensive line. The Bushland Falcons went undefeated (10–0) through the regular season, but lost in the first round of the UIL 2A Division I playoffs to eventual state champion Muleshoe.

Richburg also competed in track & field at Bushland as a thrower. He captured the state title in the shot put event at the 2009 UIL T&F Championships, with a PR throw of 18.34 meters (60 ft 1 in), setting a school record, that ranks as the fourth-best throw by a Texas prep athlete in any classification and worthy of the Texas Class 2A gold medal. In the discus, he got a top-throw of 53.31 meters (172 ft 2 in) at the 2009 Texas Tech Regional Qualifiers, where he took bronze. He also competed as a hurdler earlier in high school.

Regarded as a two-star recruit by Rivals.com, Richburg was not ranked among the best offensive lineman of the class of 2009, which also included D. J. Fluker and Taylor Lewan. He chose Colorado State over Texas Christian, the only other scholarship offer he received.

College career 

In the beginning of his senior season at Colorado State, Richburg was graded at greater than 90 percent in all five graded games.

Professional career 
Richburg was considered one of the best center prospects for the 2014 NFL Draft. He was drafted by the New York Giants in the second round of the 2014 NFL Draft.

New York Giants
Due to numerous injuries to offensive lineman in his rookie season, most notably to guards Chris Snee and Geoff Schwartz, Richburg, despite initially intended as the backup center in his rookie season, was forced to play out of position at guard.  Because of his limited experience and relatively small size for the position, he struggled.
In 2015, Richburg was returned to his natural position of center, and with a year of NFL experience under his belt, he soon showed himself to be among the league's best centers; Pro Football Focus ranked him as the NFL's #2 center for the 2015 season.

In Week 3 against the Washington Redskins on September 25, 2016, Richburg was ejected for committing two unsportsmanlike conduct penalties. He became the first player to be ejected under this new rule since NFL applied it during the beginning of 2016.

On November 4, 2017, Richburg was placed on injured reserve with a concussion.

San Francisco 49ers
On March 14, 2018, Richburg signed a five-year, $47.5 million contract with the San Francisco 49ers.

In Week 14 of the 2019 season, Richburg suffered a torn patellar tendon and was ruled out for the rest of the season. He was placed on injured reserve on December 11, 2019. Without Richburg, the 49ers reached Super Bowl LIV, but lost 31-20 to the Kansas City Chiefs. He was placed on the active/physically unable to perform list (PUP) at the start of training camp on July 28, 2020, and placed on the reserve/PUP list at the start of the regular season on September 5, 2020.

In March 2021, Richburg underwent hip surgery. On June 2, 2021, Richburg retired from professional football.

References

External links 
 Colorado State Rams bio
 New York Giants bio
 San Francisco 49ers bio

1991 births
Living people
American football centers
Colorado State Rams football players
New York Giants players
People from Potter County, Texas
Players of American football from Louisville, Kentucky
San Francisco 49ers players